John P. Melfi is a United States–based television and movie producer noted for his work on Sex and the City, Rome, Nurse Jackie, House of Cards, and And Just Like That....  Melfi has been nominated for Primetime Emmy Awards eight times between 1998 and 2013, and won twice.

References

External links
 

Film producers from Pennsylvania
Television producers from Pennsylvania
Living people
Primetime Emmy Award winners
Year of birth missing (living people)
Businesspeople from Philadelphia